Colo is a small town located north-west of Sydney in New South Wales, Australia. It is home to the Colo River and parts of the Wollemi National Park. The main road through Colo is Putty Road. The locality of Colo is bounded in the south and the east by the Hawkesbury River.

References

Towns in New South Wales
City of Hawkesbury
Hawkesbury River